"Slow" is a song by Norwegian DJ Matoma featuring American singer Noah Cyrus, released on 11 November 2017 as the lead single from Matoma's second album One in a Million. The track reached the top 30 in Norway and also charted in Sweden and on the US Dance/Electronic Songs chart.

Writing and recording
Matoma heard "Make Me (Cry)" by Noah Cyrus and thought Cyrus' voice has "so much soul and personality", so reached out to her. The two worked apart, with Matoma based in Norway. Matoma also said that with "Slow", he wanted to expand beyond his tropical house sound and "do something different from before" but still put out a "banger" before the album and tour. He later said he wanted to make a song that was "future bass-inspired song with lots of bass and big drums in the chorus".

Music
Paper called "Slow" a "party ballad". Billboard described it as "uplifting, feel-good" and a "lover's pop anthem".

Music video
Matoma and Cyrus also collaborated on a live version of the music video.

Track listing

Charts

References

2017 singles
2017 songs
Matoma songs
Noah Cyrus songs
Songs written by Matoma